Kaiserstuhl railway station may refer to:

 Kaiserstuhl AG railway station, on the Winterthur to Koblenz line in the Swiss canton of Aargau
 Kaiserstuhl OW railway station, on the Brünig line in the Swiss canton of Obwalden